Santa's Little Helper is the debut extended play and first Christmas release by Australian country music singer Jasmine Rae. The EP includes two original tracks and three covers and was released in November 2012.

On 21 November 2012, Rae released a video for the lead single "Santa's Helper" with Rae explaining "Many Christmas songs are asking Santa to bring us love on Christmas Day. Others ask him to bring world peace and similar aspirations. This song is about asking Santa for a job!"

Upon released Rae said "Growing up, we kept our Christmas CDs in the same box as our Christmas tree for 11 months of the year. So when December came around, it was a really special experience for my brother and me to unpack the CDs and put them on as we all decorated the house." adding "It was, and still is, a really magical time at our place".

In an interview with Kelly Fuller on ABC radio, Rae told she's always wanted to make a Christmas album.

Track listing

Release history

References

Jasmine Rae albums
2012 debut EPs
EPs by Australian artists
Christmas albums by Australian artists
Country music EPs